Candy Rock is a 2003 album by the Japanese rock group Shonen Knife. It is one of their few albums not to be released in the United States. All of the songs are sung in Japanese.

Track listing
All tracks by Naoko Yamano
"Mass Communication Breakdown"
"Messy Room"
"Wonder Land"
"Walrus (Seiuchi)"
"Virtual Reality"
"Crossword"
"Doubts" (or "Mystery") (Na Zo)
"Monkey Brand Oolong Tea"

Personnel
Naoko Yamano - guitar, vocals
Atsuko Yamano - bass, drums, backing vocals
 Phil Elverum – guitar
 Kyle Field – vocals
 Roman Yumeno – bass guitar, guitar

References

Shonen Knife albums
2003 albums